Mar George Njaralakatt (born 23 July 1946) is a Syro-Malabar Catholic Archbishop. He retired as the archbishop of Archdiocese of Tellicherry on 15 January 2022 at the age of 75.

Early life
Bishop Mar George Njaralakatt was born to Varkey (Late) and Mary (Late) Njaralakatt on 23 June 1946 at Kalayanthani in Thodupuzha Taluk in Idukki District. His LP School studies were at St. Josephs School, Arakuzha and he completed UP at St. Marys High School near Muvattupuzha. His family migrated to Malabar in 1960 and settled in Nadavayal, Wayanad, where he completed high school studies at St. Thomas High School, Nadavayal. He achieved a BA degree at Mysore University.

Ordination
After completing college studies he joined St. Joseph's Minor Seminary Thalasserry in 1963. He was ordained priest on 20 December 1971 at Thalassery by Mar Sebastian Valloppilly. He served as the vicar general of Bhadravathi diocese from 2007 to 2010. On 18 January 2010, he was appointed the Bishop of the newly erected Diocese of Mandya, in Karnataka and was consecrated on 7 April 2010 at Infant Jesus Cathedral Church at Hinkal, Mysore. On 30 October 2014, he was raised as the Archbishop of Archdiocese of Tellicherry at St. Joseph's Cathedral, Tellicherry.

References

External links
Official Website of Archdiocese of Tellicherry
George Njaralakatt on Catholic-Hierarchy.org

1946 births
Living people
Syro-Malabar archbishops
People from Idukki district